The Japanese School of Suzhou (JSS) is a Japanese international school in the Suzhou New District of Suzhou, China. On February 28, 2005, the Ministry of Education of China approved the establishment of the school.

The current campus on Huahai Road (淮海路) in the Suzhou New District was scheduled to open in September 2012. The original campus, which opened in 2005, had a cost of 20 million yuan.

See also
 Japanese people in China
Mainland China-aligned Chinese international schools in Japan:
 Kobe Chinese School
 Yokohama Yamate Chinese School

References

Further reading

 Sugimura, Tomomi (椙村 知美 Sugimura Tomomi) and Shin'ichi Hayashi (林 伸一 Hayashi Shin'ichi). "Variations of Japanese language at Suzhou Japanese school in China" (Archive; 蘇州日本人学校における日本語事情—海外子女をとりまく日本語のバリエーション). Journal of the Literary Society of Yamaguchi University (山口大学文学会志) 58, 77–89, 2008. 山口大學文學會. See profile at CiNii, See profile at  Yamaguchi University Navigator for Open Access Collection and Archives (Yunoca; 山口大学学術機関リポジトリ). Profile
 Sugimura, Tomomi (椙村 知美 Sugimura Tomomi). "マインドマップを用いた作文指導--蘇州日本人学校中学3年生クラスでの実践事例" (Archive). 山口国文 (31), 100–84, 2008–03. 山口大学人文学部国語国文学会. See profile at CiNii. See profile at  Yamaguchi University Navigator for Open Access Collection and Archives (Yunoca; 山口大学学術機関リポジトリ). Profile

External links
 Japanese School of Suzhou 

Suzhou
International schools in Suzhou
Educational institutions established in 2005
2005 establishments in China